Sergey Gerasimov may refer to:
Sergey Vasilyevich Gerasimov (1885–1964), Russian painter
Sergei Gerasimov (film director) (1906–1985), Russian actor, film director and screenwriter
Sergei Gerasimov (swimmer), Russian gold medalist in swimming at the 2003 Summer Universiade
Sergey Gerasimovich Mitin, politician
Sergey Gerasimovich Mikaelyan, film director